Rhesala moestalis is a species of moth of the family Erebidae first described by Francis Walker in 1866. It is found throughout subtropical Africa, from Sierra Leone in the west to Somalia in the east and South Africa in the south. It is also found on most of the African Indian Ocean islands. and in South and South-East Asia.

They have a wingspan of 14–20 mm.

The larvae feed on Fabaceae species, such as Acacia mellifera, Acacia tortilis and Albizia lebbeck. In India they have been recorded as a pest of nursery and young shade trees in tea plantations with a preference for Albizia odoratissima, Albizia procera as well as Albizia lebbeck.

Original description
George Hampson described them in The Fauna of British India, Including Ceylon and Burma in 1894 as follows:

References

Calpinae
Moths described in 1866
Moths of the Comoros
Moths of Africa
Moths of Madagascar
Moths of Mauritius
Moths of Réunion
Moths of Seychelles
Moths of the Middle East